Eocheiurus is a genus of trilobites in the order Phacopida, that existed during the upper Cambrian in what is now Russia. It was described by Rozova in 1960, and the type species is Eocheirurus salairicus. The species epithet is derived from the name of the town, Salair, in which the  type locality, the Tolstochikhin Formation, is located.

References

External links
 Eocheirurus at the Paleobiology Database

Phacopida genera
Fossil taxa described in 1960
Cambrian trilobites
Fossils of Russia